The men's tournament of volleyball at the 2009 Summer Universiade at Belgrade, Serbia began on July 1 and ended on July 11.

Teams

Preliminary round

Group A

Group B

Group C

Group D

Classification round

Classification 17-23 places

Classification 9-16 places

Classification 21-23 places

Classification 17-20 places

Classification 13-16 places

Classification 9-12 places

Quarterfinals

Semifinals

Classification 5-8 places

Finals

Classification 21-22 places

Classification 19-20 places

Classification 17-18 places

Classification 15-16 places

Classification 13-14 places

Classification 11-12 places

Classification 9-10 places

Classification 7-8 places

Classification 5-6 places

Bronze-medal match

Gold-medal match

Final standings

External links
Reports

Volleyball at the 2009 Summer Universiade

tr:2009 Yaz Üniversite Oyunları’nda voleybol